Bruno Okshtuni (born 16 March 1987) is an Albanian footballer who currently plays as a midfielder for Besa Kavajë in the Albanian Superliga. He has been loaned out to both KF Naftëtari Kuçovë and KS Luftëtari Gjirokastër to gain experience

References

1987 births
Living people
Footballers from Kavajë
Albanian footballers
Association football midfielders
Besa Kavajë players
KF Naftëtari Kuçovë players
Luftëtari Gjirokastër players
Kategoria Superiore players
Kategoria e Parë players